Gurnam Bhullar is an Indian singer, actor and lyricist associated with Punjabi language music and films. He is best known for his single Diamond released in 2018.

Background
Bhullar hails from Kamal Wala village in Fazilka district. He resides in Chandigarh.

Career

Singing
Gurnam Bhullar won Awaaz Punjab Di Season 5.

Acting
On 8 March 2019, Gurnam Bhullar released his debut film Guddiyan Patole.

Controversy
In July 2021, Gurnam Bhullar was arrested by the Punjab Police for shooting a music album in Rajpura at time of COVID-19 restrictions and not following the health norms.

Discography

Albums

Singles

Film songs

Filmography

References

External links

 
 
Top 10 Gurnam Bhullar Hit Punjabi Songs

21st-century Indian male singers
21st-century Indian singers
Living people
Male actors from Punjab, India
Bhangra (music) musicians
Indian folk-pop singers
People from Fazilka district
Year of birth missing (living people)